Mictosoma is a monotypic genus of crustaceans belonging to the monotypic family Mictosomatidae. The only species is Mictosoma ramosum.

The species is found in Northern Europe.

References

Isopoda
Isopod genera
Monotypic crustacean genera